Attitude & Virtue is the sixth album by Corey Hart, released in 1992 by Sire Records. It generated four charting singles. It was first released in Japan on 25 April, before being released in Canada on 28 April.

Background 
The opening song, "Back in the Hand", is about Hart's rise as a young artist and later decline in popularity.  "The song is autobiographical, sort of a positive statement from me", he told the Vancouver Sun. Hart added, "It's a song that I sit back and say, 'There are going to be peaks and valleys'." 

The album as a whole was inspired by Hart's travels through Asia and Africa. The song "She's Everywhere" is a tribute to the worldwide popularity of singer-songwriter Madonna, while "Poster" expresses the anger and frustration Hart felt in China when he observed people his age whose individual choices were repressed for the collective good.

Track listing
All songs written by Corey Hart.

"Back in the Hand" - 4:15
"Love and Money" - 4:09
"Baby When I Call Your Name" - 4:03
"She's Everywhere" - 4:20
"I Want (Cool Cool Love)" - 4:03
"Always" - 4:26
"Poster" - 4:09
"92 Days of Rain" - 5:46
"Without Your Love" - 4:51
"Sonnets from the Portuguese" - 4:33
"Baby When I Call Your Name" (instrumental version) - 4:03 (bonus track for Japanese release only)

Personnel 
 Corey Hart – lead and backing vocals, acoustic piano (2-10), arrangements 
 Jeff Bova – keyboards (1), acoustic piano (1)
 Greg Phillinganes – keyboards (2-10), Hammond organ (2-10)
 Simon Franglen – Synclavier, Synclavier programming (6)
 Tim Pierce – electric guitars, acoustic guitars, slide guitar, mandolin, sitar
 Marty Walsh – guitars (6)
 John Pierce – bass
 Kenny Aronoff – drums, percussion 
 Gerald Albright – saxophones 
 Ruby Turner – backing vocals 
 Terence Trent D'Arby – additional backing vocals (2)
 Anna Lacazio – additional backing vocals (5)
 Duff McKagan – additional backing vocals (8)
 Jane Siberry – additional backing vocals (10)

Production 
 Corey Hart – producer (1-5, 7-10), associate producer (6)
 Tom Lord-Alge – producer (1-4, 9), engineer (1-4, 9), mixing (1-4, 7, 8, 9)
 Richard Perry – producer (6)
 Simon Franglen – associate producer (6), engineer (6)
 Patrick Dillett – additional engineer (1-4, 9), engineer (5, 7, 8, 10), mixing (5, 10)
 Stephen Stewart-Short – additional engineer (6)
 Brian Malouf – mixing (6)
 Bob Ludwig – mastering at Masterdisk (New York City, New York).
 Erik Gagnon – art direction, design 
 Peggy Sirota – photography
 Larry Frazin – management 
 Larry Tollin – management
 Platinum Management, Inc. – management company

References

1992 albums
Corey Hart (singer) albums
Albums produced by Richard Perry
Albums produced by Tom Lord-Alge
Sire Records albums